Joshua Heintzeman (born December 5, 1977) is a Minnesotan politician serving in the Minnesota House of Representatives since 2015. A member of the Republican Party of Minnesota, Heintzeman represents District 6B, which includes the city of Brainerd and parts of Crow Wing County in central Minnesota.

Early life, education, and career
Heintzeman was born in Eden Prairie, Minnesota, but moved with his family at a young age to Motley, where he entered the Motley School. He was home-schooled after fifth grade by his parents. His junior year, Heintzeman enrolled as a PSEO student at Central Lakes College in Brainerd, Minnesota. He studied there from 1995 to 1997, graduating with an Associate of Arts Degree in business.

Since 1995, Heintzeman has owned and operated Up Country Log, a business that builds trusses, columns, hand railings, and stair systems from debarked logs.

Heintzeman has served on the Thirty Lakes Watershed Board and is a member of the Brainerd Chamber of Commerce. He also served as the Chair of the Crow Wing County Republicans.

Minnesota House of Representatives
Heintzeman was elected in 2014, defeating incumbent Representative John Ward . During the 2019-20 legislative session, he served as an assistant minority leader for the Republican Party. Heintzeman serves as the minority lead for the Environment and Natural Resources Finance and Policy Committee and sits on the Legacy Finance and Ways and Means Committees.

Electoral History 

}}

}}

}}

}}

}}

Personal life 
Heintzeman married his wife, Keri, on June 26, 1999. They have six children and reside in Nisswa, Minnesota.

References

External links

Rep. Josh Heintzeman (06B) - Minnesota House of Representatives
Heintzeman, Joshua "Josh" - Legislator Record - Minnesota Legislators Past & Present

1977 births
Living people
People from Nisswa, Minnesota
Republican Party members of the Minnesota House of Representatives
21st-century American politicians
People from Motley, Minnesota